The King of Route 66 is an arcade game developed by Sega AM2 and distributed by Sega, released for arcades in 2002-2003, and ported to PlayStation 2 in 2003. It is the sequel to 18 Wheeler: American Pro Trucker.

Reception

The PlayStation 2 version received "mixed" reviews according to the review aggregation website Metacritic.

References

External links
 
 

2002 video games
Arcade video games
Multiplayer and single-player video games
PlayStation 2 games
Sega-AM2 games
Sega arcade games
Sega Games franchises
Sega video games
Split-screen multiplayer games
Tose (company) games
Truck racing video games
Video game sequels
Video games set in the United States
Video games developed in Japan